Dutch–Turkish relations are the  interstate relations between the Netherlands and Turkey. The diplomatic relations widely encompass and span four centuries, beginning in 1612. The first Turkish representative in the Netherlands started activities in 1859.

Before the Dutch had their own consuls in the Levant, they traded under the French Capitulations of 1569 until they sent Cornelius Haga as a consul to Istanbul in 1611. The States-General was responsible for appointing the consul, but the Levant merchants in these cases were closely consulted. The poor payment system for the consuls disrupted the potential successes of the relationship between consul and merchant community. The merchants requested changing to the Venetian fixed salary payment, but the States-General went against their wishes and tried to find other means of income. This posed problems for the Dutch consuls, and there are many reports of cases where consuls exerted their authority over the nations members who did not want to pay consulate and embassy dues. Despite internal struggle within the Dutch nation, it had a good relationship with the Ottomans and in 1804 Sultan Selim III (1789–1807) appointed the first resident representative to Amsterdam.

Turkeye is a village of Sluis, a municipality located in the west of Zeelandic Flanders, in the south-western part of the Netherlands. In 1604, Prince Maurits changed the name of the village in Turkeye to thank the Turkish sailors for their support to the Dutch during the battle with the Spaniards in the Dutch War of Independence.

The history of Turkey and the Netherlands stretches back to the 17th century, when the first representative of the States-General was sent to the Sublime Porte. Relations between the two have continued ever since, further cemented by Turkish guest workers in the '60s and '70s, and today by strong economic ties.
Both countries are NATO members. the Netherlands is a member of the European Union, Turkey is not a member.

Political relations

Turkey and the Netherlands are both members of the Council of Europe, the North Atlantic Treaty Organization (NATO), the Organisation for Economic Co-operation and Development (OECD), the Organization for Security and Co-operation in Europe (OSCE), the World Trade Organization (WTO) and the Union for the Mediterranean. Also the Netherlands is a European Union member and Turkey is a candidate.

Yunus Affair

During a state visit to the Netherlands In March 2013, Prime Minister Erdoğan criticized the placement of the Turkish-Dutch foster child Yunus with lesbian foster parents.  Deputy Prime Minister of the Netherlands Lodewijk Asscher considered the involvement of Turkey "totally inappropriate" and called it "presumptuous" when a foreign power expresses an opinion on the policy of Dutch foster care.  Erdoğan proposed that the Turkish Ministry of Family Affairs and the Dutch Ministry of Security and Justice consult each other about the care of children of Turkish origin, but Prime Minister Mark Rutte rejected this proposal. Rutte said that placement of a child in a foster family always involves trying to match the child's background to that of the foster family. Failing that, the interest of the child comes first, and no distinction is made on the basis of religion or sexual orientation. Erdoğan intended to turn to the European Court of Human Rights to enforce Yunus to be reunited with his biological parents.

Referendum campaign dispute

In the wake of the Turkish constitutional referendum, events featuring Turkish Ministers were scheduled to be held in the Netherlands in March 2017 in order to promote the proposed amendments to the Constitution of Turkey. The Dutch Government under Mark Rutte prohibited Turkish Ministers from entering the Netherlands for rallies, stating "We are of the opinion that Dutch public spaces are not the place for political campaigns of other countries". Turkish President Recep Tayyip Erdoğan sharply condemned the decision, calling the Netherlands a "Nazi remnant". Overseas election campaigning, even in diplomatic missions, is illegal under Turkish law; yet most political parties in Turkey including the ruling AKP have flouted the law. On 13 March 2017, Deputy Turkish Prime Minister Numan Kurtulmuş announced the suspension of high-level diplomatic relations between the Netherlands and Turkey and barred the Dutch ambassador from returning to Ankara.

Sanctions against Turkey
Netherlands criticized the 2019 Turkish offensive into north-eastern Syria. On 10 October 2019, a large majority of Dutch MPs backed the introduction of sanctions against Turkey.

History
In October 2021, in the wake of the appeal for the release of Turkish activist Osman Kavala signed by 10 western countries, Turkish president Recep Tayyip Erdoğan ordered his foreign minister to declare the Dutch ambassador persona non grata, alongside the other 9 ambassadors. However, the ambassadors did not receive any formal notice to leave the country and Erdoğan eventually stepped back.

Economic relations
Trade volume between Turkey and the Netherlands has increased remarkably over the years. In 2008, the Netherlands exported for almost 4 billion euros worth of goods to Turkey. This amount is doubled compared to 2000. 
Turkey exported in the same year 1.6 billion euros worth of goods to the Netherlands, with a share of 32 percent for garments.

Turkey is a very popular holiday destination for Dutch tourists. In 2009, more than 1.1 million Dutch tourists visited Turkey.

As of February 2011, 1894 Dutch companies have invested in Turkey, declared the Foreign Minister of Turkey Ahmet Davutoglu, making the Netherlands the country with the biggest investment in projects in Turkey.

Visits

Diplomacy

Of the Netherlands
Ankara (Embassy)
Istanbul (Consulate-General)
Antalya (Consulate)
Gaziantep (Consulate) 
Iskenderun (Consulate)
Izmir (Consulate)
Marmaris (Consulate)

Republic of Turkey
The Hague (Embassy)
Amsterdam (Consulate-General)
Rotterdam (Consulate-General)
Deventer (Consulate)
Leiden (Honorary consulate)

Embassies 
The Embassy of the Netherlands is located in Ankara, Turkey. The Embassy of Turkey is located in The Hague, the Netherlands.

See also
European Union–Turkey relations
Foreign relations of the Netherlands
Foreign relations of Turkey 
Armenian genocide denial

2017 Dutch–Turkish diplomatic incident
Dutch people in Turkey
Dutch people in Middle East
Turks in the Netherlands
Turks in Europe 
Cornelius Haga
Remigration Turkey Pulls, The Netherlands Pushes?, by GÜRKAN ÇELIK, an article on return migration published in Turkish Review
The Union Church of Istanbul, located in the former embassy
  
 
 Islam in the Netherlands

References

External links
NTFF - The Netherlands-Turkey Friendship Foundation

External links
 Embassy of The Netherlands in Ankara
 Embassy of Turkey in The Hague
 Consulate–General of The Netherlands in Istanbul
 Consulate–General of Turkey in Rotterdam
 Diplomatic missions of the Netherlands in Turkey
 Diplomatic missions of Turkey in the Netherlands

 
Turkey
Bilateral relations of Turkey